The 2022 Lamar Hunt U.S. Open Cup tournament proper will feature teams from both professional and amateur teams in the United States soccer league system.

Qualification for the 2022 tournament includes local qualifying matches contested by 90 amateur teams scheduled to take place in 2021.  One team also qualified by winning the 2021 National Amateur Cup, and other clubs playing in national leagues that are not fully professional qualify based on their results in 2021 league play. Clubs playing in fully professional leagues may enter the tournament proper and bypass the qualification process.

Qualification procedures
The United States Soccer Federation's (U.S. Soccer) Open Cup Committee manages both the tournament proper and the local qualification process.

Clubs based in the United States that play in a league that is an organization member of U.S. Soccer are generally eligible to compete for the U.S. Open Cup, if their league includes at least four teams and has a schedule of at least 10 matches for each club.

U.S.-based teams in Division I, II and III professional leagues qualify for the U.S. Open Cup automatically, provided they are eligible. To be eligible, these teams must be members in good standing of their leagues on December 31, 2021, and remain so through the 2022 U.S. Open Cup Final. The league must also remain in operation through the 2022 U.S. Open Cup Final. A new Division I, II or III professional league must have its match schedule announced to the public by January 31, 2022, and the first match must be scheduled for no later than seven days before the first scheduled round of the U.S. Open Cup tournament proper that involves the team's division. If a new club joins an existing Division I, II or III league, the league must meet the aforementioned criteria applicable to new leagues in order for the new club to be eligible for the U.S. Open Cup.

A professional team that is majority owned by a higher-level professional team or whose player roster is materially managed by a higher-level professional team is ineligible to participate in the U.S. Open Cup.

Clubs that are below Division III are Open Division teams. To be eligible for the 2022 U.S. Open Cup, an Open Division team must have been a playing member in good standing of its league on August 31, 2021, and remain so through the 2022 U.S. Open Cup Final. The league must have been in operation since no later than August 31, 2021, and remain so until the 2022 U.S. Open Cup Final. A team that started its first season of competition in an existing league must have started its new league's schedule no later than August 31, 2021.

Starting in 2019, the winner of the previous year's National Amateur Cup automatically qualifies for the U.S. Open Cup. The cup winner enters the tournament proper in the first round with the other Open Division clubs.

National leagues may elect to use the results of their previous year's seasons to determine which of their teams qualify for the U.S. Open Cup in lieu of having their teams play local qualifying matches. If a national league so elects, its teams are not eligible to participate in local qualifying. To qualify as a national league, the league must
 Have a minimum of 50 active U.S.-based teams in good standing,
 Have a common championship each season that is only available to league teams and is compulsory,
 Use a league format with a standings table as opposed to a single-elimination (knockout) format,
 Have teams in at least three U.S. time zones among Eastern, Central, Mountain and Pacific, with the three time zones containing the most teams each having at least 15% of the member teams,
 Have two time zones represented by at least three different U.S. states or the District of Columbia and a third time zone represented by at least two different U.S. states or the District of Columbia,
 Have teams in at least 10 different U.S. states or the District of Columbia,
 Have played for at least three years meeting the above criteria and
 Timely pay the team-based Open Cup entry fee for all teams in the league.

Eligible Open Division clubs that did not win the National Amateur Cup and are not members of national leagues must have submitted an application to enter local qualifying by August 09, 2021.

Once applications for local qualifying are approved, U.S. Soccer estimates the number of Open Division teams needed in the U.S. Open Cup, based on the anticipated participation of professional teams. One of these slots is allocated to the National Amateur Cup champions. The remainder are allocated among the pool of local qualification teams and the national leagues, based on the relative number of teams in each, resulting in a target number of local qualifiers. The number of rounds of local qualifying and the number of teams receiving byes in the first round of qualifying are then established to set the number of local qualifiers as close as possible to the target number. Byes are distributed randomly and are meant to avoid unnecessary travel but are kept to a minimum to preserve the integrity of the qualification tournament. Once the qualification tournament format has been finalized, the number of local qualifiers becomes fixed, unless a team that qualifies later becomes ineligible. After the December 31, 2021 professional clubs entry application deadline, the final number of Open Division teams needed in the 2022 U.S. Open Cup will become known. From this number, the fixed number of local qualifiers plus one for the National Amateur Cup champion are subtracted to determine the number of slots for clubs from the national leagues. These slots are allocated among the leagues based on their relative numbers of U.S.-based eligible teams.

National Amateur Cup
Lansdowne Yonkers FC defeated Cal FC, 2–1, to win the 2021 National Amateur Cup and qualify for the 2022 U.S. Open Cup. The eleven winners of the fourth round of local qualifying will join them as the twelve Open Division teams in the tournament proper.

Local qualifying
U.S. Soccer originally announced that 92 teams would participate in local qualifying. Four rounds of local qualifying matches will result in 11 clubs advancing to the tournament proper.

First qualifying round
The first qualifying round matches were scheduled to be played on September 18. All East and Central Region Teams, 14 Southeast Region and 22 West Region teams were given byes into the Second Qualifying Round One game was delayed due to bad weather and was instead played on September 24.

West Region

Southeast Region

Second qualifying round
The second qualifying round was played on multiple weekends. The East and Central Region played between September 12th and October 1st. The West And Southeast region was played between October 16th and October 24th. The game between Modesto City FC and Contra Costa FC was postponed until Oct 31 due to poor field conditions.

Central Region

Northeast Region

West Region

Southeast Region

Third qualifying round
The third qualifying round was played on multiple weekends. The Northeast and Central Region played October 16th and 17th. The West And Southeast region was played on November 20th and 21st.

Central Region

Northeast Region

West Region

Southeast Region

Fourth qualifying round
The fourth qualifying round will be played on multiple weekends. The Northeast and Central Region played November 20th and 21st. The West And Southeast region was played on December 18th and 19th. The eleven winners of this round will advance to the First Round in March 2022.

Central Region

Northeast Region

West Region

Southeast Region

References

Qualification
2021 in American soccer
2022 in American soccer